The 2007 Amstel Gold Race cycling race took place on Sunday April 22. It was the 42nd edition of the annual road race in the Dutch province of Limburg.

Stefan Schumacher attacked just before final climb, and others couldn't catch him. Gerolsteiner got 1-2 after Davide Rebellin won the sprint for 2nd place. Rebellin took the lead of the season-long 2007 UCI ProTour series following his second place.

General Standings

2007-04-22: Maastricht-Valkenburg, 253.1 km

References

External links
Race website

Amstel Gold Race
2007 UCI ProTour
2007 in Dutch sport